Wushu Township is a township in Wan'an County, Jiangxi, China. , it administers Xuzhen Residential Neighborhood and the following six villages:
Longwei Village
Daling Village
Shetian Village
Shaokeng Village
Xinliao Village
Daliao Village

References 

Township-level divisions of Jiangxi
Wan'an County